"Grande armée" is a song by French rapper Lacrim. It peaked at number two in France.

Charts

Weekly charts

Year-end charts

Certifications

References

2017 songs
2017 singles